The Republican Party is a political party in Iceland. It is not the same as the 1953 party with an identical name, although the name was chosen as a homage to that party.

It was officially granted list letter I on 8 March 2013, and started to compose a candidate list for participation in the 2013 Icelandic parliamentary election. It, however, forwent participation in the election, choosing to merge with seven other parties into the new Households Party, which will contest the election with the list letter I.

References

Defunct political parties in Iceland
Political parties established in 2013
2013 in Iceland